The Battle of Grozny of March 1996, also known as Operation Retribution, was a three-day surprise attack by Chechen fighters who stormed the capital city of Grozny that was occupied by Russian Armed Forces.

Background

By June 1995 the Chechens had lost all the major cities and towns. On General Aslan Maskhadov's orders, the Chechen resistance shifted from conventional warfare to guerrilla warfare, relying on the mountains.

Battle

On March 6, 1996 Chechen fighters launched a surprise attack on Grozny, striking from three directions and encircling outlying Russian posts and  local pro-Moscow Chechen police stations, catching Russian troops off guard, inflicting significant losses, overrunning much of it and capturing weapons and ammunition stores. The attack was supposedly intended to show that the Chechens could still operate against Russian forces.

Aftermath

Three days later, after the Chechens left the city, fighting in the Grozny continued for several more days; the Russian units that entered Grozny periodically engaged in battle with one another, mistaking each other for the enemy.

President Dzokhar Dudayev allegedly called the attack a "little harassing operation". The attack was only a rehearsal for a much larger operation that took place in August 1996.

See also
 Battle of Grozny (disambiguation)
 Battle of Grozny (August 1996)

Notes

Sources

 
 
 https://reliefweb.int/report/russian-federation/chechnya-russian-federation-situation-report-1-february-14-march-1996

Battles of the First Chechen War
1996 in Russia